British-American rapper and record producer Daniel Dumile, also known under several stage names, most notably MF DOOM, released six studio albums, two live albums, three compilation albums, 10 instrumental albums, seven collaborative albums, 14 singles, and 32 music videos in his career.

Dumile initially performed under the stage name Zev Love X as a member of the rap group KMD. The group would release their debut studio album Mr. Hood in May 1991. In 1993, just before the release of the second KMD album Black Bastards, Dumile's brother and fellow KMD member Subroc was struck by a car and killed, and that same week the group was dropped from Elektra Records.

In September 1999, Dumile would release his debut studio album Operation: Doomsday under a new stage name, MF DOOM, wearing a mask similar to that of Marvel Comics super-villain Doctor Doom. In 2003, he would release his second and third studio albums, Take Me to Your Leader, under the stage name King Geedorah, and Vaudeville Villain under the name Viktor Vaughn.

Dumile's first commercial breakthrough came in March 2004, with the album Madvillainy, released with producer Madlib under the group name Madvillain. The album peaked at number 179 on the US Billboard 200. In August of that year, he released the next Viktor Vaughn album, VV:2, which was followed by his fifth studio album Mm..Food in November.

He would continue to release collaborative albums in the following years, including The Mouse and The Mask with Danger Mouse in 2005. In 2009, he released his sixth and final solo studio album, Born Like This, under the pseudonym Doom (stylized in all caps). From this point until his death in 2020, Dumile exclusively released collaborative works, including NehruvianDoom with Bishop Nehru in 2014 and three other studio projects.

Studio albums

Solo albums

Collaborative albums

Live albums

Compilation albums

Instrumental albums

EPs

Demos

Singles

As lead artist

As featured artist

Promotional singles

Guest appearances

Music videos 
1991: "Who Me?" (as KMD)
1991: "Peachfuzz" (as KMD)
1999: "I Hear Voices"
1999: "Dead Bent"
2000: "?" (w/ Kurious)
2001: "My Favorite Ladies"
2003: "The Final Hour" (as King Geedorah)
2003: "Mr. Clean" (as Viktor Vaughn)
2004: "Rhinestone Cowboy" (as Madvillain)
2004: "Accordion" (as Madvillain)
2004: "All Caps" (as Madvillain)
2005: "A.T.H.F. (Aqua Teen Hunger Force)" (as Danger Doom)
2006: "Monkey Suite" (as Madvillain)
2007: "Gunfight" (w/ The Mighty Underdogs)
2009: "Benetton" (w/ Kurious & MC Serch)
2011: "Strange Ways" (as Madvillain)
2012: "Guv'nor" (as JJ Doom)
2013: "Bookhead" (as JJ Doom)
2014: "Bookhead Remix" (Clarks Originals Presents Doom)
2014: "Darkness (HBU)" (as NehruvianDoom)
2015: "Ray Gun" (w/ BadBadNotGood & Ghostface Killah)
2015: "Masking" (w/ ASM (A State of Mind) as King Dumile)
2016: "Frankie Sinatra" (w/ The Avalanches & Danny Brown)
2016: "Super Hero" (w/ Kool Keith)
2018: "Bomb Thrown" (w/ Czarface)
2018: "Meddle with Metal" (w/ Czarface)
2018: "Death Wish" (as MUGGS x DOOM, w/ Freddie Gibbs)
2018: "Drop the Bomb" (w/ YOTA : Youth of the Apocalypse)
2018: "Assassination Day" (as MUGGS x DOOM, w/ Kool G Rap)
2018: "One Beer"
2020: "Meathead" (w/ Bishop Nehru)
2021: "Barcade" (w/ Atmosphere & Aesop Rock)
2022: "Belize" (w/ Danger Mouse & Black Thought)
2022: "Barz Simpson" (w/ Sonnyjim, The Purist & Jay Electronica)

References

External links 
 Official MF Doom discography at Stones Throw Records

Hip hop discographies
Discographies of American artists